The Battle of Tirapegui was fought on April 26, 1836, between Liberals and Carlists in Spain during the First Carlist War.  With the help of the French Foreign Legion, the Liberals were victorious.

References

Conflicts in 1836
Battles involving the French Foreign Legion
April 1836 events
Battles of the First Carlist War
Battles in Navarre